Constitution of 1923 may refer to:

Egyptian Constitution of 1923
1923 Constitution of Romania